James MacKinnon may refer to:

 J. B. MacKinnon (James Bernard MacKinnon, born 1970), Canadian journalist and author
 James G. MacKinnon (born 1951), Canadian economics professor
 James Angus MacKinnon (1881–1958), Canadian politician
 James Mackinnon (politician) (1841–1910), Australian politician
 James MacKinnon (cricketer) (1865–1957), Australian cricketer

See also
 James McKinnon (1932–1999), American musicologist
 James McKinnon (historian) (1860-1945), Scottish historian